Bridey Murphy is a purported 19th-century Irishwoman whom U.S. housewife Virginia Tighe (April 27, 1923 – July 12, 1995) claimed to be in a past life. The case was investigated by researchers and concluded to be the result of cryptomnesia.

Hypnotic regression

In 1952, Colorado businessman and amateur hypnotist Morey Bernstein put housewife Virginia Tighe of Pueblo, Colorado, in a trance that sparked off startling revelations about Tighe's alleged past life as a 19th-century Irishwoman. Bernstein used a technique called hypnotic regression, during which the subject is gradually taken back to childhood. He then attempted to take Virginia one step further, before birth, and was astonished to find he was listening to Bridey Murphy.

Tighe's tale began in 1806, when Bridey was eight years old and living in a house in Cork. She was the daughter of Duncan Murphy, a barrister, and his wife Kathleen. At the age of 17, she married barrister Sean Brian McCarthy, who she claimed taught at Queen's University Belfast, to which she moved. Tighe told of a fall that caused Bridey's death and of watching her own funeral, describing her tombstone and the state of being in life after death. It was, she recalled, a feeling of neither pain nor happiness. Somehow, she was reborn in America 59 years later, although Tighe/Bridey was not clear how this event happened. Tighe herself was born Virginia Mae Reese in the Midwest in 1923, had never been to Ireland, and did not speak with even the slightest hint of an Irish accent.

Book publication and response

The story of Bridey Murphy was first told in a series of articles by William J. Barker, published in the Denver Post in 1954. In early 1956, Doubleday released a book by Bernstein, The Search for Bridey Murphy.  Movie rights had already been sold by the time of its publication (see below). At her insistence, Tighe was given the pseudonym "Ruth Mills Simmons".

The Bridey Murphy craze
The best-selling book created a sensation; people would throw Bridey Murphy-themed "come as you were" parties and dances, and jokes abounded, such as cartoons of parents greeting newborns with "welcome back!"

Popular songs of the time included "The Ballad of Bridey Murphy" by Fran Allison, "The Love of Bridey Murphy" by Billy Devroe's Devilaires, and "Do You Believe (In Reincarnation)" by Lalo Guerrero. There was a "Reincarnation cocktail".

Stan Freberg recorded a satirical sketch in 1956 titled "The Quest For Bridey Hammerschlaugen", based on the LP containing excerpts of the actual first hypnosis session. Freberg hypnotizes Goldie Smith (voiced by June Foray) to regress her to different eras, with humorous interruptions by Smith. At the end, Smith hypnotizes Freberg, who becomes Davy Crockett. When Smith mocks him for not being able to profit on the recent Davy Crockett craze, Freberg says that in his next life, he "may be Walt Disney."

The past-life themed 1956 film I've Lived Before is said to have been inspired by the craze.

Research challenging the story
The biographical details related by Bridey were not rigorously checked before the book's publication. However, once the book had become a bestseller, almost every detail was thoroughly checked by reporters who were sent to Ireland to track down the background of the elusive woman. It was then that the first doubts about her "reincarnation" began to appear.
Bridey said she was born on December 20, 1798, in Cork and that she had died in 1864. No record was found of either event. Also, no evidence could be found of a wooden house called The Meadows, in which Bridey said she had lived, just of a place of that name near Cork. Additionally, during the 19th century, most houses in Ireland were made of brick or stone. Bridey pronounced her husband's name as "See-an", although Seán is typically pronounced "Shawn", especially in Ireland. Queen's University Belfast did not exist at the time Bridey claimed her husband was working there. Brian, which is what Bridey preferred to call her husband, was also the middle name of the man to whom Virginia Tighe was married. Tighe claimed Bridey went to a St. Theresa's Church, which did indeed exist, but it was not built until 1911, long after Bridey was said to have died.

Some of the details provided by Tighe proved to be more authentic. For example, her descriptions of the Antrim coastline were very accurate, as was her account of a journey from Belfast to Cork. She recounted that the young Bridey shopped for provisions with a grocer named Farr; it was discovered that such a grocer had existed, although this may simply have been a coincidence.

Some researchers came to the conclusion that the best way to discover the truth was to check back not to Ireland but rather to Tighe's own childhood and her relationship with her parents. Morey Bernstein stated that Tighe/Simmons was brought up by a Norwegian uncle and his German-Scottish-Irish wife. However, he did not mention that her birth parents were both partly Irish, and that she had lived with them until the age of three. He also did not mention that an Irish immigrant named Bridie Murphy Corkell (1892–1957) lived across the street from Tighe's childhood home in Chicago, Illinois. Bridie immigrated to the U.S. in 1908. Although Tighe claimed that she did not know Mrs. Corkell's maiden name, Bridie's spinster sister Margaret Murphy was living with the Corkells in the 1930 census. Researchers noted that many of the elements Virginia Tighe described in Bridey's life corresponded to ones in her own childhood. Cryptomnesia has been frequently mentioned as an explanation for Tighe's memories. Because of correlations with Tighe's past life and discrepancies with the Ireland of the Bridey Murphy story's time, writers such as Michael Shermer consider any paranormal interpretation of the case to be "thoroughly disproven".

Film adaptation
The Search for Bridey Murphy was made into a 1956 film of the same name. Produced by Paramount, the film starred Teresa Wright (as Ruth Simmons), Louis Hayward, and Nancy Gates. It was directed by Noel Langley.

Later events
The New York Times, in Bernstein's obituary, characterized the eventual feelings held by supporters of the story:

Virginia Tighe disliked being in the spotlight and was skeptical about reincarnation, although in later years she stated: "Well, the older I get the more I want to believe in it." Despite these feelings, in 1966 she appeared on the TV panel game show To Tell the Truth. She died in Denver in 1995 (as The New York Times later put it, "perhaps for the second time"). Bernstein gave up hypnotism after Bridey Murphy and began working in business. Success followed, and he became a prominent local philanthropist. He died in Pueblo, Colorado, in 1999.

References in popular culture 
Bridey Murphy, a band consisting of Bill Cowsill, Paul Cowsill, Barry Cowsill, and Waddy Wachtel, released a single in 1974, "The Time Has Come."

In Robert Wise's 1963 film The Haunting, Julie Harris' character is jokingly accused of being a reincarnation of Bridey Murphy by Russ Tamblyn's character.

In the Carl Barks-produced Scrooge McDuck comic book story "Back to Long Ago!" (1957), Scrooge and Donald Duck get hypnotized to find out about their past lives, learning of their existence as pirates in 1564. Scrooge's hired hypnotist, "Prof. Mesmer J. Spellcaster, H. P., D. H.," has a row of books on his office shelf that includes Quest for Tidie Brophy, Search for Lydie Burfee, Paging Gracie Macie, and The Search for Murphy's Bridie.

In the movie Peggy Sue Got Married, Peggy's grandfather mentions reading a book about a woman in Colorado who claimed to have lived 159 years ago in Ireland.

In the My Favorite Martian episode "Extra! Extra! Sensory Perception" The Search for Murphy's Bridie is mentioned when Mrs Brown is accidentally regressed.

In Thomas Pynchon’s V., a character is mentioned as reading the book  “The Search for Bridey Murphy”. It is described as a book written by a Colorado businessman to tell people there was life after death.

In Sydney Sheldon's Tell Me Your Dreams, Bridey Murphy is referenced after a hypnosis session is carried out on the main character.

See also
 On a Clear Day You Can See Forever, a 1965 Broadway musical with a past-life theme, loosely based on the 1926 play Berkeley Square

Notes

References

Further reading
Fads and Fallacies in the Name of Science by Martin Gardner (Dover Publications, 1957)
A Scientific Report on "The Search for Bridey Murphy" by Milton V. Kline et al. (Julian Press, 1956) (OCLC: 543329)

External links
Search for Bridey Murphy (1956) - Entire movie (with hard subtitles). Accessed August 30, 2019.
Bridey Murphy in the Skeptic's Dictionary

Cecil Adams on the Bridey Murphy controversy
Time magazine: Yes, Virginia, There Is a Bridey
 Lalo Guerrero's son sings "Do You Believe (In Reincarnation)", with an introduction explaining its connection to the Bridey Murphy craze

Hypnosis
Parapsychology
Popular psychology
Reincarnation
Nonexistent people